Eslam Qaleh may refer to:
 Eslam Qaleh, Mashhad, Iran
 Eslam Qaleh, Sarakhs, Iran
 Islam Qala, a town in Herat Province, Afghanistan